AYH may refer to:
 American Youth Hostels
 Arcadis AYH plc, a London-based surveying firm
 Alvin Youngblood Hart, an American musician
 Hadrami Arabic (ISO 639-3 ayh), an Arabic variety spoken by the Hadhrami people